Orthodox Patriarch of Antioch may refer to:

 Greek Orthodox Patriarch of Antioch, primate of the Greek Orthodox Patriarchate of Antioch
 Syriac Orthodox Patriarch of Antioch, primate of the Syriac Orthodox Patriarchate of Antioch

See also
 Patriarch of Antioch
 Greek Orthodox Patriarchate of Antioch
 Syriac Orthodox Patriarchate of Antioch
 Catholic Patriarch of Antioch (disambiguation)
 Syriac Patriarch of Antioch (disambiguation)